Compton is a historic home in Trappe, Talbot County, Maryland.  It is a two-part Flemish bond brick dwelling, which is the result of two major building periods and subsequent minor alterations. The main part is five bays long with a three-brick belt course between floors.  The second part is a -story kitchen / dining room wing.  Also on the property is a two-story brick milkhouse.  It was home to Maryland's 18th Governor Samuel Stevens, who expanded the building to its present configuration.

It was listed on the National Register of Historic Places in 1974.

References

External links
, including photo from 1973, at Maryland Historical Trust

Houses in Talbot County, Maryland
Houses on the National Register of Historic Places in Maryland
Houses completed in 1794
National Register of Historic Places in Talbot County, Maryland
1794 establishments in Maryland